Extra or Xtra may refer to:

Arts, entertainment and media

Film
 The Extra (1962 film), a Mexican film
 The Extra (2005 film), an Australian film

Literature
 Extra (newspaper), a Brazilian newspaper
 Extra!, an American media criticism magazine
 Diario Extra (Costa Rica), a newspaper
 Extra Magazine, an Italian weekly magazine
 Newspaper extra, a supplemental issue
 Xtra (newspaper), by the Norwegian Young Conservatives, 1922-2010
 Xtra Magazine, a Canadian website and former newspaper

Music
 Extra (Gilberto Gil album), 1983, and the title track
 Extra, Vol. 1, an album by KMFDM
 "Extra", a 2019 song by Future from Save Me (EP)
 "Extra", a 1966 song by Tages from their album Extra Extra

Television and radio
 Extra (Australian TV channel)
 Extra (Australian TV program), 1991–2009
 Extra (American TV program), since 1994
 extra (franchise), or extr@, a language education television program 2002–2004
 Extra, a TV game by Norsk Tipping
 XTRA, call sign formerly used by Southern California radio station XEWW-AM
 BBC Radio 1Xtra, a Black British radio station from the BBC
 Capital Xtra, a Black British radio station from Global Media & Entertainment

Businesses and organisations
 Extra (gum), by Wrigley
 Extra (service areas), a UK chain
 Extra (supermarket), a German chain
 Extra (Coop), a Norwegian supermarket chain
 EXTRA, a former mobile phone brand of SmarTone
 Extra (retail chain), Brazil
 Pibb Xtra, a soft drink
 Tiendas Extra, a Mexican convenience store chain

Computing
 Xtra (ISP), an Internet service provider
 Xtra (Macromedia), a software plug-in
 Yahoo!Xtra,  XtraMSN, a web portal

Sports
 Extra (cricket), a run not involving hitting the ball
 Extra (sailing), a sail not part of the sail plan

Transportation
 Extra Aircraft, a German light aircraft manufacturer
 Renault Extra, a van
 Xtra (automobile), an English three-wheel cyclecar
 Kolb Mark III Xtra, an ultralight aircraft

Other uses
 Extra (acting), an actor in a minor role
 Extra, West Virginia, a place in the U.S.
 EXTRA artillery rocket system, an Israeli artillery rocket system
 Walter Extra (born 1954), German pilot and aircraft designer

See also
 Extras (disambiguation)